Anthony DeWayne "Tony" Woodruff (born November 12, 1958 in Hazen, Arkansas) is a former American football wide receiver who played for three seasons in the National Football League for the Philadelphia Eagles from 1982–1984. He was a member of the San Francisco 49ers during training camp in 1986. He was drafted by the Eagles in the ninth round of the 1982 NFL Draft. He played college football at Fresno State.

Professional career

Philadelphia Eagles
Woodruff was drafted by the Philadelphia Eagles in the ninth round of the 1982 NFL Draft. He played in only one game in 1982. On July 17, 1983, Woodruff broke his collarbone while attempting a diving catch during the first practice session of training camp, and missed the next eight weeks. He was waived on September 2, 1985.

San Francisco 49ers
Woodruff signed with the San Francisco 49ers on June 25, 1986, but was released on August 16 during training camp.

Arrest
Woodruff was arrested on a cocaine possession charge on May 9, 1986 when police found six grams of cocaine in the car he was driving, shortly before he was signed by the 49ers. He was ordered to stand trial on January 8, 1987. He was placed in a drug diversion program in his hometown of Fresno, California to avoid prosecution.

References

1958 births
Living people
Players of American football from Arkansas
American football wide receivers
Los Angeles Harbor Seahawks football players
Fresno State Bulldogs football players
Philadelphia Eagles players
San Francisco 49ers players
People from Hazen, Arkansas
Sportspeople from Fresno, California